Katie Gregson-MacLeod is a Scottish musician. She rose to fame in 2022 when her song "Complex" went viral on TikTok.

Career 
Gregson-MacLeod released her first single, “Still a Sad Song” in 2020 when she was 18. In 2021, while attending university, she independently released her debut EP Games I Play with that track.

On August 4, 2022, Gregson-MacLeod posted a short video of part of her song "Complex" on TikTok. Overnight, the clip garnered over 100,000 views. The clip eventually amassed over 7.2 million views. She released a full version of the song later that month. She signed with Columbia Records and released the EP Songs Written for Piano on that label later that year. She was named one of BBC Radio Scotland's 25 Artists to Watch in 2022.

Personal life 
Gregson-MacLeod is from Inverness. She has played music since an early age and began songwriting around age 16. She is a history student at the University of Edinburgh.

Discography 

EPs:

 Games I Play (2021, independent)
 Songs Written For Piano (2022, Columbia Records)

References 

Alumni of the University of Edinburgh
21st-century Scottish women musicians
Scottish women singer-songwriters
People from Inverness
Living people
Year of birth missing (living people)